Guéckédou or Guékédou is a town in southern Guinea near the Sierra Leone and Liberian borders. It had a population of 79,140 in 1996 (census) but has grown massively since the civil wars and, it is  estimated to be 221,715. It was a centre of fighting during the Second Liberian Civil War and the Sierra Leone Civil War in 2000 and 2001.

The city is renowned for its large weekly market, which attracts traders from across Southern Guinea, Sierra Leone, Liberia and Côte d'Ivoire.

On February 12, 2007, the town's police station was ransacked amidst the resumption of protests and strikes against President Lansana Conté. 

As of June 11, 2014, volunteers organized by Guéckédou's Red Cross have been working in sanitation, disinfection, and monitoring efforts to help contain the 2014 West Africa Ebola outbreak. Some reported they were "encountering resistance in some villages such as Bafassa, Wassaya and Tolebengo in Guéckédou Prefecture, where rumours help fuel the flames of fear ... A main focus of the interventions involves deploying volunteers to communities to raise awareness on how to prevent the spread of the disease and, in the process, address the fear and stigma gripping many communities." The World Health Organization estimated cumulative totals of 227 cases and 173 deaths occurred in Guéckédou as of June 22, 2014. 11 patients were in Ebola Virus Disease (EVD) Treatment Centres in Guéckédou as of that date, and 527 contacts were being followed up on as part of a mandatory 21-day observation period.

Hospitals 
 Hôpital Central de Guéckédou
 Hôpital Préfectoral de Guéckédou
 Poste de Santé Sokoro
 Poste de Santé de Vao
 Poste de Santé de Farako

Places of Worship 
 Église NEO Apostolique
Eglise protestante Évangélique de Hermankono
Eglise protestante Évangélique de Kwamen
Eglise protestante Évangélique de Bambo
Eglise protestante Évangélique de Baladou
Eglise protestante Évangélique de Gueckedou Lélé
Eglise protestante Évangélique de Kamalo
Eglise protestante Évangélique de Bethanie
Paroisse Notre Dame du Rosaire

References

External links

 "Protests as Guinea strike resumes", BBC news, 12 February, 2007

Sub-prefectures of the Nzérékoré Region